Paradise is the eighth solo album by Leroy Hutson, the first (and only) album to be released for Elektra Records, after his contract with Curtom Records ended.

Track listing

 "Classy Lady" 5:30
 "Nice and Easy" 4:30
 "You Make it Happen" 4:57
 "Paradise" 5:40
 "She's Got It" 7:57
 "Nobody But You" 4:44
 "Stay At It" 5:36

Personnel
Leroy Hutson - lead & background vocals, drums, horn arrangements, keyboards, percussion, rhythm arrangements, synthesizer bass, vocal arrangements  
Dina Andrews - direction
Jerry Butler, Stephen Harris, Nicholas Caldwell - composers
Ken Cooper - trumpet
Nicholas Caldwell - mouth organ, producer, rhythm arrangements, vocal arrangements
Melvin Coleman, Reggie Gillerson - bass 
Steve Barri Cohen, David Egerton, Ann Fry, Larry Miles. Jeffrey Norman, Rick Sanchez - engineers
Charles Waring - liner notes
Ron Slenzak - photography
Norman Ung - art direction
David Nathan - tape research
Orville McFarland - trombone
Giovanni Scatola - mastering
Rick Sanchez - mixing
Bill Englot - remastering
Tom Ferrone, Stephen Harris, Larry Michael White, Rick Sanchez, Larry Andrew Williams - guitars
Pat Leonard, Lonnie Reaves, Tim Tobias, Grady Wilkins, Jerry Wilson - keyboards
Eric Hackett, Tim Tobias - synthesizer
Chester Thompson, Wayne Stewart - drums
Stephen Harris, Kenneth Nash, Lonnie Reaves - percussion
Rick Conrad - reissuing series
Jerry Wilson - saxophone
Alfonso Surrett, Alton Littles, Jr., Calvin Bridges, "Day" Askey Burke, Martin Dumas, Myrna Postel, Nate Hutson, Roz Thompson - background vocals

References

External links 
Paradise LP at Discogs

1982 albums
Leroy Hutson albums
Elektra Records albums